Klaw (Ulysses Klaue) is a fictional character appearing in American comic books published by Marvel Comics. The character is depicted as a human physicist who has been transformed into solid sound, and who wears a sonic emitter on his right wrist as a prosthetic device. He is a supervillain often in conflict with the Fantastic Four and the Avengers, and he is also an enemy of the Black Panther and Ka-Zar.

The character is featured in other Marvel-endorsed products such as arcade and video games, animated television series, and merchandise such as trading cards. Andy Serkis portrayed Klaue in the Marvel Cinematic Universe (MCU) films Avengers: Age of Ultron (2015) and Black Panther (2018), and the Disney+ series What If...? (2021).

Publication history

The character first appeared in Fantastic Four #53 (1966) and was created by Stan Lee and Jack Kirby.

Fictional character biography
Ulysses Klaue is the son of Nazi war criminal Colonel Fritz Klaue of the Blitzkrieg Squad led by Baron Strucker. He was sent by Adolf Hitler to Wakanda to learn their secrets. After World War II, he moved back to Belgium, later anglicized his name to "Klaw," and raised his son with tales of Wakanda.

Klaw later becomes a physicist, working in the field of applied sonics. In order to continue his design of a sound transducer which converts sound waves into physical mass, Klaw steals the metal vibranium to power his device. This is a metal substance known to exist only in certain meteoric deposits in the small African nation of Wakanda. By stealing this rare mineral, Klaw comes into conflict with the Wakandan ruler/superhero T'Chaka whom Klaw murders in cold blood. T'Chaka's adolescent son T'Challa, who watched his father fall to the invaders, then attacks Klaw to avenge his father. Klaw manages to escape at the cost of his right hand.

Years later, Ulysses resurfaces with a sonic emitter/gun on his right wrist as a replacement prosthetic device for his missing hand that can create any kind of object or creature he can conceive by only using sound. He has also created a device that turns him into a being composed solely of sound, making him immortal in the process. Klaw as a professional criminal battles T'Challa (who has now officially become the newest Black Panther) and superhero team the Fantastic Four in New York state, but he is defeated.

Klaw is imprisoned but freed by the Crimson Cowl, which turns out to be an alias of Ultron. Joining the second incarnation of the Masters of Evil, Klaw and the other villains battle superhero team the Avengers. The Avengers, however, defeat them, with the Black Panther subduing Klaw. Klaw would attempt to reform the second Masters of Evil to fight the Avengers, but his scheme would be foiled by the all-female team the Lady Liberators.

Managing to escape custody again, Klaw journeys back to Wakanda where he helps steal a device capable of augmenting the metal-disintegrating property of a vibranium alloy. Encountering the Thing, the Human Torch, and the Black Panther, Klaw is defeated.

Klaw later joins forces with the murderous Solarr and traps the Avengers within a solid sound barrier. Klaw threatens to execute them if the Black Panther does not abdicate the throne of Wakanda to him. Realizing that Klaw himself is disguised as one of the hostages while using a sound creation of himself to appear outside the barrier, the Panther manages to expose and subdue Klaw and Solarr before he could make good his threat.

Klaw is later freed from prison by a member of the extra dimensional race of Sheenareans, who wish him to use his sonic powers to help open a dimensional portal big enough for their invading armada to enter Earth. Klaw agrees and after a skirmish with Ka-Zar in London, travels with the Sheenarean to the Savage Land where there is a vibranium deposit large enough to create the portal. After Ka-Zar repulses the invaders, Klaw flees into the Sheenarean dimension, and unable to salvage anything substantial from his allies, uses their technology to return to Earth.

Materializing in the Nexus of All Realities located in the Florida Everglades, Klaw happens upon the wand of the Molecule Man. Helping the Molecule Man find a body to possess, Klaw and his new ally travel to New York to wreak revenge on their common enemy, the Fantastic Four. Klaw is subdued by the visiting Impossible Man.

Klaw finds his powers waning, resulting in him having to manipulate a group of street youths into helping him gain the material needed to restore his power. With Black Panther's help, Klaw's scheme backfires. He finds himself imprisoned within his own gun-hand, stored at research facility Project Pegasus. In Marvel Two-in-One #57-58 (Nov.-Dec 1979), Klaw is freed by fellow villain Solarr, although both are defeated by a group of heroes, including the Thing, Quasar, Giant-Man, and Aquarian.

After that, Klaw fights the Thing, Ka-Zar, and American Eagle.

Klaw's career soon takes a downward spiral, after an encounter with the mutant Dazzler results in his humanoid form being dissolved and his sound energy being blasted out into space, where it ends up being collected by Galactus. His energy is found by Doctor Doom during the limited series Secret Wars. Doom restores Klaw to normal. The loss of his physical form has had repercussions; Klaw now has the mind of a child and is quite insane, a symptom of which is speaking in rhyme. Doom exploits Klaw's madness, convincing the villain to re-dissect him as part of a mad gambit to steal the powers of both Galactus and the Beyonder. However, the Beyonder possesses Klaw after losing his powers, leading to Klaw tricking Doom into giving up his stolen Godhood and teleporting the two back to Earth, where Klaw's mental state slowly heals.

Klaw fights Daredevil and Vision, before being recruited by the Wizard to join his latest incarnation of the Frightful Four. Attacking the Fantastic Four while the group are performing a delicate scientific procedure on the Human Torch (whose powers had gone out of control), Klaw throws The Thing into the medical pod that was attempting to drain the excess radiation from Torch, resulting in Ben Grimm being returned to normal. Klaw and his teammates, along with the Fantastic Four, are quickly captured by the rogue Watcher Aron, who ultimately returns Klaw and his fellow villains to prison after the Fantastic Four break free.

Klaw's imprisonment would not last. Escaping during the Acts of Vengeance story line, Klaw is taken in by A.I.M., who plant a pain-control device into his gun-hand to control him. He is then sent to attack the reformed supervillainess Volcana, in hopes of luring out her lover Molecule Man but abandons the battle when his gun-hand is destroyed. Klaw is later recruited by the "Pacific Overlords" group, led by Doctor Demonicus, but turns against the group and instead aids the West Coast Avengers in defeating them when it becomes apparent that Demonicus had become a thrall of a dangerous demon. He later joins Justine Hammer's version of the Masters of Evil, fighting the Thunderbolts on several occasions. When Earth's vibranium deposits begin to explode due to a 'vibranium cancer' introduced into the world when Captain America's shield was broken and improperly repaired, Klaw travels to Wakanda with the goal of absorbing the sound energy of the imminent explosion to become even stronger. Captain America is able to defeat him when he uses the damaged shield to absorb Klaw's attack. The blast realigns the shield molecules so that the shield is repaired and the vibranium cancer destroyed.

Klaw features in the opening arc of the fourth Black Panther series, a flashback story that features the origin of the title character. The character ultimately resurfaces again, having (through unknown means) successfully uploaded his sound based essence onto the Internet and later been downloaded, via BitTorrent, by the Wizard to fight the Fantastic Four again as part of a new incarnation of the Frightful Four.

Klaw is later seen with Wizard's Frightful Four when it comes to helping Intelligencia capture Mister Fantastic.

Chameleon later poses as Klaw in order to infiltrate Intelligencia and be ready for the Sinister Six to attack them.

Klaw is enlisted by the Wizard to capture Carnage, so that he can be added to the latest version of the Frightful Four, alongside Karl Malus. The Wizard's attempts to control the symbiote (which is in control of Kasady's lobotomised body) fail, so he decides to bond it to Malus, and subdue his mind. Klaw subdues Malus, and the operation is a success, creating "Superior Carnage". The "Frightful Foundation" then attack New York city hall, as part of Wizard's plan to get his clone son's attention. During a battle with Superior Spider-Man, Wizard loses control of Superior Carnage, who stabs Klaw with a vibranium spear, causing him to detonate. The sonic explosion tears the symbiote away from Malus, and onto Wizard, but it then abandons him for Kasady (Whom Superior Spider-Man had brought to the scene). As Carnage attempts to kill Wizard, Klaw, whose consciousness had been projected onto the "sound wall" of the universe by the explosion, focuses the last of his strength into creating a bolt of lightning that brings down Carnage, separating the symbiote from its host. Klaw reflects that that could be his final act, as his essence spreads further into the sound wall, and will soon be too thin for him to retain his consciousness.

During the Avengers: Standoff! storyline, Klaw is an inmate of Pleasant Hill, a gated community established by S.H.I.E.L.D.

Powers and abilities
Courtesy of a vibranium-powered sonic converter, Ulysses Klaw was converted into a being composed of psionically "solidified" sound, giving him a somewhat inhuman appearance. The character is described as having superhuman durability and strength sufficient to lift tons of matter. The molybdenum steel sound generator that serves as a prosthetic appliance on Klaw's right wrist is able to transform ambient sound to perform a series of functions, including the projection of intense high-volume sonic waves and blasts of concussive force and the creation of mobile sound/mass constructs. The sound converter was invented by Klaw and later improved by AIM scientists and technicians. Klaw can also sense his surroundings using sonar. When he fought Volcana while trying to abduct Molecule Man he demonstrated the ability to create "cohesive sound". This was essentially an entangling/crushing construct that absorbed ambient noise to increase its size and strength. The noise from the target's struggles to remove the construct would make it larger and stronger. Volcana was only able to escape it by changing into her ash form.  After Klaw became temporarily commingled with the ship of the cosmic entity Galactus and reconstructed by Doctor Doom, he became able to create semi-autonomous creatures that he could direct to attack his foes and his creatures are similarly made of solidified sound and display a similar superhuman strength level as Klaw himself.

Klaw is unable to regain his original organic form. He has a susceptibility to vibranium, which can cause his mass/energy form to temporarily collapse. He is also subject to temporary mild insanity when forced to exist as sonic energy without humanoid form for long periods of time. As a result of his transformation, Klaw was at first unable to exist outside a medium that allows the propagation of sound waves (i.e. in a vacuum) without the technological improvements made to his sonic converter by AIM.  But after being reconstituted by A.I.M. his "solid sound" body has different properties than normal sound waves and is not affected by a vacuum. It was demonstrated that in this form that Klaw could also generate and direct sonic attacks through physical objects without needing his emitter by merely touching the material.

Ulysses Klaw holds a Ph.D. in physics and is an expert physicist specializing in applied sonics.

Reception
 In 2018, Comicbook.com ranked Klaw 2nd in their "8 Best Black Panther Villains" list.
 In 2020, CBR.com ranked Klaw 4th in their "Marvel: Ranking Black Panther's Rogues Gallery" list.
 In 2022, Screen Rant included Klaw in their "15 Most Powerful Black Panther Villains" list.
 In 2022, CBR.com ranked Klaw 2nd in their "10 Most Iconic Black Panther Villains" list.

Other versions

Heroes Reborn
In the Heroes Reborn universe, created by Franklin Richards, Klaw appeared as a member of Loki's Masters of Evil.

In other media

Television
 Klaw appears in the 1967 Fantastic Four series, voiced by Hal Smith.
 Klaw makes a non-speaking cameo appearance in the Spider-Man and His Amazing Friends episode "Attack of the Arachnoid".
 Klaw appears in the 1994 Fantastic Four series episode "Prey of the Black Panther", voiced by Charles Howerton. Years ago, he infiltrated Wakanda and killed T'Chaka, but loses his right hand to T'Chaka's son, T'Challa, who goes on to become the Black Panther and seek revenge against Klaw. In the present, Klaw attacks Wakanda, having replaced his missing hand with a sonic inverter. He fights Black Panther and the Fantastic Four, during which he is transformed into an entity made of solidified sound, only to be defeated when the heroes use Vibranium to absorb Klaw.
 Klaw appears in the Fantastic Four: World's Greatest Heroes episode "Frightful", voiced by an uncredited actor. This version is a member of the Frightful Four.
 Klaw appears in The Super Hero Squad Show, voiced by A. J. Buckley. This version is a member of Doctor Doom's Lethal Legion.
 Klaw appears in Black Panther, voiced by Stephen Stanton. This version has a cybernetic hand that can convert into a variety of tools.
 Klaw appears in The Avengers: Earth's Mightiest Heroes, voiced by Mark Hamill. In the episode "The Man in the Ant Hill", he leads a small band of mercenaries to a S.H.I.E.L.D. research facility in Africa to steal a sample of Vibranium from Hank Pym. While the scientist uses Pym Particles to shrink and defeat the mercenaries, Klaw escapes. He later wields a sonic disruptor over his right hand to assist Man-Ape in killing T'Chaka in order to seize control of Wakanda's Vibranium deposits. In the episode "Panther's Quest", Klaw fights Pym until the Grim Reaper blasts the former into Wakanda's Vibranium mound, turning him into a being of pure sound. He attacks Grim Reaper and his HYDRA agents until Pym and Iron Man use Klaw's sonic emitter on the Vibranium to absorb him.
 Klaw appears in Ultimate Spider-Man, voiced by Matt Lanter. This version is a member of the Frightful Four.
 Ulysses Klaue appears in Avengers Assemble, voiced by David Shaughnessy in season three and Trevor Devall in season five. This version wields a sonic converter in place of his left hand.
 Ulysses Klaue appears in Lego Marvel Super Heroes - Black Panther: Trouble in Wakanda, voiced again by Trevor Devall.
 Ulysses Klaue appears in the Marvel Future Avengers episode "Black Panther", voiced by Taketora in Japanese and Patrick Seitz in English.

Marvel Cinematic Universe

Ulysses Klaue appears in media set in the Marvel Cinematic Universe (MCU), portrayed by Andy Serkis. This version is an Afrikaner arms dealer, an old acquaintance of Tony Stark from before the events of the live-action film Iron Man, and was literally branded a thief when Klaue successfully stole a large amount of Vibranium from Wakanda. Klaue first appears in the 2015 live-action film Avengers: Age of Ultron, and makes a subsequent appearance in the 2018 live-action film Black Panther. Additionally, Serkis voices an alternate timeline version of Klaue in the Disney+ animated series What If...? episode "What If... Killmonger Rescued Tony Stark?"

Video games
 Klaw appears as a boss in Captain America and the Avengers.
 Both the comics and MCU incarnations of Klaw appear as playable characters in Lego Marvel's Avengers, voiced again by Matt Lanter.
 Klaw appears as a boss and playable character in Lego Marvel Super Heroes 2. Additionally, his MCU counterpart appears as a playable character via the Black Panther DLC.
 Klaw appears as a playable character in Marvel: Future Fight.
 Klaw appears as a boss in Marvel Ultimate Alliance 3: The Black Order.
 Klaw appears as the final boss of the "War for Wakanda" DLC story expansion for Marvel's Avengers, voiced by Steve Blum. He and Crossbones are hired by Monica Rappaccini of A.I.M. to steal Vibranium from Wakanda, only for the pair to run afoul of the Black Panther and the Avengers. In the ensuing fight, Klaw becomes exposed to raw sonic energy-infused Vibranium and transforms into a being of pure sound, but eventually dies as a result of the mutation.

References

External links
 
 Klaw at Marvel.com

Black Panther (Marvel Comics) characters
Characters created by Jack Kirby
Characters created by Stan Lee
Comics characters introduced in 1966
Fictional Afrikaners
Fictional amputees
Fictional Belgian people
Fictional characters who can manipulate sound
Fictional characters with immortality
Fictional characters with superhuman durability or invulnerability
Fictional engineers
Fictional murderers
Male characters in film
Marvel Comics characters who can move at superhuman speeds
Marvel Comics characters with superhuman strength
Marvel Comics film characters
Marvel Comics male supervillains
Marvel Comics mutates